YSL Records (also known as Young Stoner Life Records) is an American record label based in Atlanta, Georgia. It was founded in 2016 by the Atlanta-based rapper Young Thug.  The company is a label imprint of 300 Entertainment. Its artists include Gunna, Lil Keed and more. Several contemporary artists, including Future, Lil Uzi Vert, Playboi Carti, Lil Baby, Lil Gotit, NAV, Travis Scott, and Slimelife Shawty have expressed allegiance to YSL, but are not contractually signed.

History

2016–2019
The label was announced on November 15, 2016, through a video Young Thug had posted on his Snapchat showcasing his new office. The video also includes a speech by 300 Entertainment co-founder, Kevin Liles, praising the new label. In 2017, the label announced its first signee, fellow Atlanta native Gunna who was also being courted by Thug's mentor and former label Gucci Mane & 1017 Brick Squad Records. During a string of mixtape releases that year, the label would announce further signees to the label with YoungBoy Never Broke Again signing a 5-album joint venture deal with YSL and Atlantic Records after opting against signing with Birdman's Cash Money Records, Lil Duke would also join the label alongside Thug's sisters Dolly and HiDoraah.

On August 15, 2018, Thug announced a mixtape featuring the label's signees, except YoungBoy, titled Slime Language, which he released on his 27th birthday on August 16. On September 12, Lil Baby announced a mixtape with Gunna titled Drip Harder, which was released on October 5 with Baby's label Quality Control.

On February 22, 2019, Gunna released his debut studio album Drip or Drown 2, follow the album's single "One Call", which was accompanied by a music video. On June 14, Lil Keed released his debut studio album Long Live Mexico, which was supported by three singles "Oh My God", "Proud Of Me", and "Pull Up".

2020–present
On February 28, 2020, Zaytoven released a mixtape with Lil Keed, Lil Gotit, and Lil Yachty titled A-Team. In March, Gunna announced his second album Wunna. Its lead single Skybox was released on March 6, alongside a music video. On March 16, Gunna stated on Twitter that Wunna is an acronym for: "Wealthy Unapologetic N***a Naturally Authentic". On April 3, Young Thug and Gunna released the single "Quarantine Clean", produced by Turbo. The following day, Gunna explained the album had experienced release issues due to the COVID-19 pandemic. The Gunna and Young Thug collaboration was their first released song together since "Diamonds", which was released in December 2019.

On August 7, 2020, Lil Keed released his second studio album Trapped on Cleveland 3 through YSL Records.

On December 18, 2020, YSL Records released "Take It to Trial", by Young Thug, Gunna and featuring Yak Gotti, the first single off the Slime Language 2 compilation, which followed on April 16, 2021.

On January 7, 2022, Gunna released his third studio album DS4Ever, which served as the fourth and final installment in his Drip Season series.

On May 9, 2022, members of YSL were arrested and charged with RICO-related charges stemming from a grand jury indictment filed by Fulton County District Attorney Fani Willis. Both Young Thug and Gunna were among the 28 associates charged and were arrested.

On May 13, 2022, Lil Keed died at the age of 24. 

On December 14, 2022, Gunna pled guilty to a single charge of racketeering and stated that YSL was a criminal gang.  He was sentenced to five years in prison, with one year commuted to time served, and the remainder of the sentence suspended on probation, including 500 hours of community service. On December 17, rappers Slimelife Shawty and Lil Duke also pleaded guilty. YSL founder Young Thug had 57 RICO charges dropped against him and is currently fighting in court. YSL was a criminal organization, against what YSL founder Young Thug stated it was. He insisted that YSL was just a record label. Thug's lyrics are being used against him in court which some people disagree with, stating that his lyrics are nothing more than art. Thug is now facing a minimum of 5 years in federal prison or upwards of 20 maximum.

Notable artists

Current

Former

Discography

Compilation albums

Singles

As lead artist

As featured artist

Other charted and certified songs

Artist releases

Studio albums

Extended plays

Compilation albums

Mixtapes

Notes

Culture
Many popular rap artists own YSL chains, usually given to them by Young Thug.  Lil Uzi Vert, Drake, Lil Baby, Lil Gotit, and YoungBoy Never Broke Again all have YSL chains. The official YSL Records Instagram page created a large stir after announcing a project titled Slime Language, which ended up being a compilation album by YSL Records. A phrase commonly mentioned in songs by YSL affiliates is "SLATT" (Slime Love All The Time). The acronym was created by YSL Records founder Young Thug, and was first used back in 2013. CEO, Young Thug, also launched the "SPIDER" clothing brand on December 27, 2019, which has been co-signed by YSL affiliates. Many artists on the record label grew up near Cleveland Avenue in Atlanta, Georgia like Lil Keed, Young Thug, and Cheat Code.

References

External links

2016 establishments in Georgia (U.S. state)
American companies established in 2016
American hip hop record labels
Companies based in Atlanta
Record labels based in Georgia (U.S. state)
Record labels established in 2016
Warner Music labels